The three-hole pipe, also commonly known as tabor pipe or galoubet, is a wind instrument designed to be played by one hand, leaving the other hand free to play a tabor drum, bell, psalterium or tambourin à cordes, bones, triangle or other percussive instrument.

The three-hole pipe's origins are not known, but it dates back at least to the 12th century.

It was popular from an early date in France, the Iberian Peninsula and Great Britain and remains in use there today. In the Basque Country it has increasingly gained momentum and prestige during the last century, especially during the last years of the Francoist State, following that it turned into a hallmark of Basque identity and folk culture. New pipe and tabor schools have cropped up since throughout the country, providing along with tabor the musical background for traditional Basque dance ensembles (see txistu). In Andalusia these pipes (flauta or gaita and the tambor or tamboril) are played in celebrations, Cruces de Mayo, sword dances and romerías; in the music used around Romería of El Rocío (Huelva, Andalucía) this same pipe is denominated flauta rociera, gaita rociera or sometimes pito rociero (a higher pitched whistle).

The most common form of tabor pipe in the Basque region is tuned "tone, semitone, tone", as in the pipe of Andalusia. The most common form in Provence is tuned "tone, tone, tone". The English tabor pipe is commonly tuned "tone, tone, semitone", and corresponds to the three lowest holes of a tin whistle.

See also

 Fipple
 Flabiol
 Flageolet
 Fujara
 Galoubet
 Jacques de Vaucanson
 Morris dance
 Picco pipe
 Pipe and tabor
 Txistu
 Zuffolo

References

External links
The Taborers' Society
A Plain and Easy Introduction to the English Pipe and Tabor
Address to a Society of Morris Dancers, 1914 by Sir Francis Darwin

European musical instruments
Internal fipple flutes